Limon Railroad Depot (also known as Limon station) was a major Union Pacific and Chicago, Rock Island and Pacific Railroad station in Limon, Colorado. It has been on the National Register of Historic Places since 2003.  It is included in what is now the Limon Heritage Museum and Railroad Park. It is one of seven still standing Rock Island Line stations in Colorado, and the only one restored.

History
In 1870, the Kansas Pacific railroad, now Union Pacific, was the first railroad to pass where the town of Limon is today. The town was not incorporated (and didn't have a station) yet so trains passed by without stopping on their way to Denver.

In 1888, the Rock Island Line constructed a camp for workers building the main line to Colorado Springs. The track intersected the Union Pacific track where the depot is now. The town was named after the construction supervisor for the railroad, John Limon. The Chicago, Rock Island and Pacific (Rock Island Line) then decided that Denver would be a better western terminus for their trains. In 1889, the two railroads reached an agreement to allow "The Rock" to use Union Pacific's Limon Subdivision line on trackage rights. Before that, trains went to Colorado Springs and used Denver and Rio Grande Western Railroad track north to Denver. Limon became a major junction for the two railroads, since it was where trains such as the Rocky Mountain Rocket split to Denver or Colorado Springs, respectively.

In the 1980s, approximately 70 miles of former Rock Island and Cadillac and Lake City Railway track between Limon and Colorado Springs was removed. Evidence of the former right-of-way can still be easily seen along the route. In Colorado Springs, a 5.8 mile part of the right-of-way has been turned into a rail trail known as the Rock Island Trail. Northeast of Colorado Springs, the track closely followed U.S. Highway 24 and included a large trestle over Big Sandy Creek.

The building was damaged by the 1990 tornado that tore through Limon, destroying 50 to 75 percent of the business district. The first major event after the tornado was the Weekend Western Festival in June 1992.

Service

Passenger
Limon was considered a union depot for the Union Pacific and Rock Island Line railways. It served many trains on the ex-Kansas Pacific Kansas City—Denver main line and Rock Island Line Omaha—Colorado Springs main line. It was the end of the "Limon Shuffle" where the popular Rocky Mountain Rocket train split into two trains.

Freight 
Limon is at the western end of the Kyle Railroad, a short line railroad that operates on the former Rock Island Line to Nebraska. The railroad entered service in 1982. The line often interchanges cars with the Union Pacific. Union Pacific also runs about 12 trains a day on the Limon Subdivision, the ex-Kansas Pacific main line.

Limon Heritage Museum and Railroad Park
The depot is now home to the Limon Heritage Museum and Railroad Park, a large historical museum. Railroad Park includes a Union Pacific caboose, a model railroad layout of the 1940s Limon Yard, and a 1914 dining car. It is the site of the annual Limon Railroad Days, which happens in June.

It also includes the Rock Island Snow Plow No. 95580, a single-track wedge plow, which was listed on the National Register of Historic Places in 2018.

References

External links

Limon Heritage Museum and Railroad Park - official site
Picture of station
A Union Pacific train crossing the C & RI at Limon; ca. 1976
ourjourney.info

Former Chicago, Rock Island and Pacific Railroad stations
Railway stations in the United States opened in 1889
Former Union Pacific Railroad stations in Colorado
Railway stations on the National Register of Historic Places in Colorado
Museums in Lincoln County, Colorado
Railroad museums in Colorado
History museums in Colorado
National Register of Historic Places in Lincoln County, Colorado